At Capolinea is an album by jazz trumpeter Chet Baker, recorded in Milan and originally on the Italian Jii label as Al Capolinea before being more widely released by Red Records. It features, among others, Italian guitarist Nicola Stilo and French pianist Michel Graillier, both of which contributed with original compositions.

Reception 

The Allmusic review by Steve Loewy states "This studio session is distinguished by excellent, mostly Italian jazz tunes, and a very attractive group of players not usually associated with the trumpeter. ... This amounts to a very accessible, enjoyable set of tunes -- one that may not win any awards, but should reward those who appreciate the delicate and lovely nature of Chet Baker's art".

Track listing

Side A
 "Estate" (Bruno Martino, Bruno Brighetti) – 11:45
 "Francamente" (Nicola Stilo) – 5:12
 "Dream Drop" (Michel Graillier) – 4:20

Side B
 "Lament" (J. J. Johnson) – 9:30
 "Pioggia sul deserto" (Stilo) – 5:24
 "Finestra sul mare" (Stilo) – 6:50

Personnel
Chet Baker – trumpet
Diane Vavra – soprano saxophone
Nicola Stilo – guitar, flute
Michel Graillier – piano
Riccardo dal Frà – bass
Leo Mitchell – drums

References

Chet Baker albums
1985 albums
Red Records albums